Li Tingshen is a Chinese Paralympic swimmer. He represented China at the 2016 Summer Paralympics held in Rio de Janeiro, Brazil and he won the silver medal in the men's 50 metre breaststroke SB2 event.

References

External links
 

Living people
Year of birth missing (living people)
Place of birth missing (living people)
Chinese male breaststroke swimmers
Swimmers at the 2016 Summer Paralympics
Medalists at the 2016 Summer Paralympics
Paralympic silver medalists for China
Paralympic medalists in swimming
Paralympic swimmers of China
21st-century Chinese people